Houry Gebeshian (born July 27, 1989) is an Armenian-American artistic gymnast, who has represented Armenia at the 2011 World Artistic Gymnastics Championships, the 2015 European Artistic Gymnastics Championships, and the 2016 Summer Olympics. She was a member of the Iowa Hawkeyes team during the 2008 to 2011 seasons.

Early life 
Gebeshian was born on July 27, 1989, in Cambridge, Massachusetts, to parents Christine Abrahamian and Hagop Gebeshian. She graduated from Newton North High School in  2007.

Gymnastics career

2005-2007: Club career 
Gebeshian placed 34th at the 2005 J.O. Nationals, her first J.O. competition. During her club competitive years, she trained at Massachusetts Gymnastics Center; under coaches Patrick Palmer, Shixin Mao and Joe Massimo.

2008-2011: College career 
Houry started competing for the Iowa Hawkeyes team in the 2008 season. She was a steady bars and beam worker, competing at every single meet during regular season. In her sophomore year, in 2009, Gebeshian was a consistent all-arounder, competing every single event at every meet. She was the Big-10 beam champion in 2010, as a junior, with a score of 9.950. In her senior season, in 2011, Gebeshian advanced to the 2011 NCAA Women's Gymnastics Championship as an individual all-arounder.

2011-present: International career for Armenia 
In an article with International Gymnast Magazine, Gebeshian said that she was "first inspired to compete for Armenia  when her mother informed her that as an Armenian by birth, she can have dual citizenship hence able to represent Armenia at the Olympics if she wished to. Gebeshian's mother contacted a parent of another gymnast training at the same gym, who apparently was the Olympics liaison for Armenia, checking the possibility of Gebeshian representing Armenia being of Armenian descent. He told her to "go for it!". Gebeshian's family helped foot the bill for finances for Gebeshian to attend the 2011 World Artistic Gymnastics Championships in October 2011, in Tokyo, Japan. She competed at the event, finishing with a score of 45.899, placing 128th all-around. She did not receive a berth to the 2012 Olympics but was third reserve.

After four years of international hiatus, Gebeshian returned to international competition at the 2015 European Artistic Gymnastics Championships in April 2015, held in Montpellier, France. She qualified to the all-around final, finishing 19th overall with a score of 51.198.

Gebeshian competed at the 2015 World Artistic Gymnastics Championships in Glasgow, Scotland and was qualified for the Olympics test events. Eventually on April 17 Gebeshian qualified for the 2016 Olympics, when she competed at the Olympics test events in Rio de Janeiro, Brazil. Gebeshian represented Armenia at the Olympics competing at the artistic gymnastics event on 7 August 2016 in Rio de Janeiro, Brazil.

Eponymous skill
Gebeshian has an eponymous uneven bars mount listed in the Code of Points.

Personal life 
Gebeshian graduated from the University of Iowa in 2011, with a bachelor's degree in athletic training. In 2012, she started her graduate education at Wake Forest School of Medicine, graduating in 2014 with a master's degree in medical science, and now practices as a physician assistant at the Cleveland Clinic in Cleveland, Ohio.

She maintains dual citizenship of America and Armenia.

See also

 List of gymnasts
 List of people from Massachusetts
 List of University of Iowa alumni
 List of Wake Forest University people

References 

1989 births
American female artistic gymnasts
American people of Armenian descent
Armenian female artistic gymnasts
Iowa Hawkeyes women's gymnasts
Living people
Sportspeople from Newton, Massachusetts
Wake Forest University alumni
Gymnasts at the 2016 Summer Olympics
Olympic gymnasts of Armenia
Newton North High School alumni
Originators of elements in artistic gymnastics